Westsachsenstadion is a multi-use stadium in Zwickau, Germany.  Prior to being redeveloped in 2013 it was used mostly for football matches and served as the home stadium of FSV Zwickau until 2010.  The stadium holds 5,000 people.

References

Football venues in Germany
Nazi architecture
Zwickau
Sports venues in Saxony
Buildings and structures in Zwickau (district)